This is a list of commercially released studio recordings from the solo career of ex-Icicle Works front-man, Ian McNabb.  A song has to contain vocals by McNabb to qualify for inclusion on this list.

Albums
 Truth and Beauty
 Head Like a Rock
 Merseybeast
 A Party Political Broadcast on Behalf of the Emotional Party
 Ian McNabb
 The Gentleman Adventurer
 Before All of This
 Great Things
 Little Episodes
 Eclectic Warrior
 Star Smile Strong
 Our Future In Space

Songs

References

Alternative rock discographies
Discographies of British artists
Ian McNabb albums
McNabb, Ian
McNabb, Ian